Oxford Township, also known as the College Township, is one of thirteen townships in Butler County, Ohio, United States. It is located in the northwestern corner of the county, where it meets Preble County, Ohio, and Union County, Indiana. The city of Oxford, the home of Miami University, is located in the township. It had a population of 25,469 at the 2020 census.

History
The eleventh in order of creation, Oxford Township was erected from Milford Township by the Butler County Commissioners on August 5, 1811.

The site was chosen by the State of Ohio for a college in order to fulfill the unkept promise of John Cleves Symmes.

Geography
Located in the northwestern corner of the county, it borders the following townships:
Israel Township, Preble County - north
Somers Township, Preble County - northeast corner
Milford Township - east
Hanover Township - southeast corner
Reily Township - south
Springfield Township, Franklin County, Indiana - southwest corner
Bath Township, Franklin County, Indiana - west
Union Township, Union County, Indiana - northwest

The highest point in Butler County, altitude , is in Oxford Township.

Name
It is one of six Oxford Townships statewide.

Government
The township is governed by a three-member board of trustees, who are elected in November of odd-numbered years to a four-year term beginning on the following January 1.  Two are elected in the year after the presidential election and one is elected in the year before it.  There is also an elected township fiscal officer, who serves a four-year term beginning on April 1 of the year after the election, which is held in November of the year before the presidential election.  Vacancies in the fiscal officership or on the board of trustees are filled by the remaining trustees.

References

Bert S. Barlow, W.H. Todhunter, Stephen D. Cone, Joseph J. Pater, and Frederick Schneider, eds.  Centennial History of Butler County, Ohio.  Hamilton, Ohio:  B.F. Bowen, 1905.
Jim Blount.  The 1900s:  100 Years In the History of Butler County, Ohio.  Hamilton, Ohio:  Past Present Press, 2000.
Butler County Engineer's Office.  Butler County Official Transportation Map, 2003.  Fairfield Township, Butler County, Ohio:  The Office, 2003.
A History and Biographical Cyclopaedia of Butler County, Ohio with Illustrations and Sketches of Its Representative Men and Pioneers.  Cincinnati, Ohio:  Western Biographical Publishing Company, 1882. 
Ohio. Secretary of State.  The Ohio municipal and township roster, 2002-2003.  Columbus, Ohio:  The Secretary, 2003.

External links 
Township website
County website

Townships in Butler County, Ohio
Townships in Ohio
1811 establishments in Ohio
Populated places established in 1811